James, Jim, or Jimmy Gray may refer to:

Politicians
 James Gray (Australian politician) (1820–1889), member of the Tasmanian House of Assembly
 James Gray (British politician) (born 1954), British politician
 James Gray (mayor) (1862–1916), American journalist and mayor of Minneapolis, Minnesota
 James A. Gray Jr. (1889–1952), American tobacco executive and state senator
 James H. Gray Sr. (1916–1986), mayor of Albany, Georgia
 James P. Gray (New Hampshire politician), member of the New Hampshire Senate, and previously of the New Hampshire House of Representatives
 James W. Gray (1915-1987), American politician and judge
 Jim Gray (American politician) (born 1953), American politician, mayor of Lexington, Kentucky
 Jim Gray (jurist) (born 1945), American jurist, writer and Libertarian Party candidate
 Jim Gray (UDA member) (1958–2005), leader of the Ulster Defence Association

Sports

Association football (soccer)
 James Gray (footballer, born 1875) (1875–1937), English footballer
 James Gray (footballer, born 1992), Northern Irish footballer
 James Gray (Scottish footballer) (1893–1917), Scottish footballer
 Jimmy Gray (footballer) (1900–1978), Scottish footballer

Other sports
 James Gray (New Zealand cricketer) (1887-1975), played for Canterbury
 Jim Gray (infielder) (1862–1938), professional baseball infielder from 1884 to 1893 with Pittsburgh
 Jim Gray (third baseman) (fl. 1929), American baseball player
 Jim Gray (sportscaster) (born 1959), American sportscaster
 Jimmy Gray (English cricketer) (1926–2016), played for Hampshire from 1948 to 1966
 Jimmy Gray (GAA) (born 1929), Irish former sportsperson

Academics and writers
 Sir James Gray, 2nd Baronet (c. 1708–1773), diplomat and antiquary
 James Gray (mathematician) (1876–1934), Scottish mathematician and physicist
 James Gray (mayor) (1862–1916), American journalist and mayor of Minneapolis, Minnesota
 James Gray (poet) (died 1830), Scottish linguist and poet
 Sir James Gray (zoologist) (1891–1975), British zoologist
 James H. Gray (1906–1998), Canadian journalist, historian and author
 James L. Gray (1926–2010), Scottish turbine design engineer
 Jim Gray (computer scientist) (1944–lost at sea 2007), American computer scientist and Turing Award recipient

Others
 Sir James Gray, 1st Baronet (1667–1722), armiger and merchant-Burgess of Edinburgh
 James Gray (director) (born 1969), American filmmaker
 James Gray (goldsmith), Scottish goldsmith
 James Lorne Gray (1913–1987), Canadian, president of Atomic Energy of Canada Limited
 James K. Gray (born 1933), Canadian energy entrepreneur
 James Martin Gray (1851–1935), pastor, Bible scholar and president of Moody Bible Institute
 Jim Gray (actor) (born 1957), Canadian actor
 Jimmy Lee Gray (1948–1983), American murderer and first man to be executed in Mississippi since the death penalty was reinstated
 James "Jamie" Gray, horse dealer convicted of multiple counts of animal cruelty at Spindles Farm
 The male pseudonym of Hannah Snell (1723–1792), soldier